Glenford is a village in Perry County, Ohio, United States. The population was 173 at the 2010 census.

History
Glenford had its start when the railroad was extended to that point. A post office called Glenford has been in operation since 1871.

Geography
Glenford is located at  (39.887319, -82.319809).

Demographics

2010 census
As of the census of 2010, there were 173 people, 61 households, and 47 families living in the village. The racial makeup of the village was 98.3% White, 0.6% African American, 0.6% Asian, and 0.6% from two or more races.

There were 61 households, of which 44.3% had children under the age of 18 living with them, 52.5% were married couples living together, 18.0% had a female householder with no husband present, 6.6% had a male householder with no wife present, and 23.0% were non-families. 16.4% of all households were made up of individuals, and 6.6% had someone living alone who was 65 years of age or older. The average household size was 2.84 and the average family size was 3.09.

The median age in the village was 32.1 years. 30.1% of residents were under the age of 18; 9.1% were between the ages of 18 and 24; 27.8% were from 25 to 44; 26.1% were from 45 to 64; and 6.9% were 65 years of age or older. The gender makeup of the village was 50.9% male and 49.1% female.

2000 census
As of the census of 2000, there were 198 people, 69 households, and 54 families living in the village. The population density was 1,519.0 people per square mile (588.1/km2). There were 70 housing units at an average density of 537.0 per square mile (207.9/km2). The racial makeup of the village was 96.97% White, 1.01% African American, 0.51% Native American, 1.01% Pacific Islander, and 0.51% from two or more races. Hispanic or Latino of any race were 1.52% of the population.

There were 69 households, out of which 36.2% had children under the age of 18 living with them, 63.8% were married couples living together, 7.2% had a female householder with no husband present, and 21.7% were non-families. 15.9% of all households were made up of individuals, and 7.2% had someone living alone who was 65 years of age or older. The average household size was 2.87 and the average family size was 3.20.

In the village, the population was spread out, with 28.3% under the age of 18, 12.6% from 18 to 24, 21.7% from 25 to 44, 25.3% from 45 to 64, and 12.1% who were 65 years of age or older. The median age was 35 years. For every 100 females there were 100.0 males. For every 100 females age 18 and over, there were 97.2 males.

The median income for a household in the village was $38,750, and the median income for a family was $40,625. Males had a median income of $27,083 versus $28,438 for females. The per capita income for the village was $16,084. None of the families and 1.6% of the population were living below the poverty line.

Education
Glenford is served by the Northern Local School District, which operates Glenford Elementary School in the village.

Notable person
 Larry Householder, Ohio House of Representative (1997–2004, 2017–2021) and Ohio House Speaker (2001-2004, 2019–2020)

References 

Villages in Perry County, Ohio
Villages in Ohio
1871 establishments in Ohio